T. N. Gopinathan Nair (24 April 1918 – 24 May 1999), was an Indian dramatist, novelist, poet, screenwriter and biographer of Malayalam language. One of the prolific among Malayalam playwrights, Nair published 39 plays, besides his four novels, four poetry anthologies and five biographies. He was a member of the council of Kerala Sahitya Akademi and held the char of the Kerala Sangeetha Nataka Akademi. His drama, Pareeksha, received the Vikraman Nair Trophy for the best drama and the Kerala Sahitya Akademi selected his work, Sakshi, for their annual award for drama in 1979.

Gopinathan Nair was born on 24 April 1918 in Thiruvananthapuram, in the south Indian state of Kerala to  P. K. Narayana Pillai (Sahityapanchanan   P. K. Narayana Pillai), a noted scholar and lawyer and his wife, Parukutty Amma. His primary education was at Holy Angel's Convent Trivandrum and after passing 4th standard, he continued his schooling at the Government Model Boys High School before graduating from the Government Arts College, Thiruvananthapuram, then known as Maharaja's College of Arts. Subsequently, he studied law but abandoned the studies after failing in the first year examination and joined Malayalarajyam daily as a special correspondent. Later, he also served as the editor of Malayalarajyam film magazine for a year before founding P. K. Memorial Press, named after his father, from where he published a magazine under the name, Sakhi and a daily by name, Veerakesari. he also started a book stall but all his ventures failed resulting in heavy financial losses. It was to repay the debts, Nair turned to films and he made his debut with Thiramala, a 1953 film, for which wrote the story, screenplay and dialogues; he also acted in the film along with Sathyan and Kumari Thankam. He was associated with many more films including the 1958 film, Nairu Pidicha Pulivalu. The same year, he joined the Thiruvananthapuram station of the All India Radio (AIR) as a director of plays and he served AIR until his superannuation from service in 1975. Later, he served as a consultant to Manorajyam weekly, Akashvani and Doordarshan.

Gopinathan Nair's oeuvre comprises over 50 books, falling into genres such as plays, novels, poetry, biography and travelogues, which include Ente Mini, an elegiacal reminiscences on the death of his wife. Besides, he wrote screenplay for five films, of which three, Thiramala, Aniyathi and Pareeksha, were based on his own stories and he acted in 8 films. Pareeksha, one of his plays, received the Vikraman Nair Trophy best drama. He received the Kerala Sahitya Akademi Award for Drama for his play, Sakshi, in 1979.

Personal life
Gopinathan Nair was married to Saudamini, fondly called Mini, the daughter of noted writer, Kuttippurath Kesavan Nair; the marriage taking place in 1950. The couple had two sons and a daughter. The eldest of the children, Ravi Vallathol, was a noted film and television actor. Saudamini predeceased Nair in 1973, and it was in her memory that he later wrote a book named Ente Mini. Nair died on 24 May 1999, at the age of 81.

Selected bibliography

Plays

One act plays

Novels

Poetry

Memoirs

Biography

Travelogue

Others

Screenplay

Filmography

As an actor 

 Thiramala (1953)
 Ashadeepam (1953)
 Padatha Painkili (1957)
 Nairu Pidicha Pulivalu (1958)
 Manavatti (1964)
 Aana (1983)
 Vembanaad (1990)
 Gouri (1992)

As a writer 

 Thiramala (1953)
 C.I.D. (1955)
 Aniyathi (1955)
 Christmas Rathri
 Pareeksha (1967)

See also 

 List of Malayalam-language authors by category
 List of Malayalam-language authors

References

External links 
 
 
 
 

Writers from Kerala
Malayalam-language writers
20th-century Indian essayists
20th-century Indian scholars
20th-century Indian journalists
1918 births
1999 deaths
20th-century Indian dramatists and playwrights
20th-century Indian poets
20th-century Indian novelists
People from Thiruvananthapuram
20th-century Indian actors
Malayalam screenwriters
Indian male film actors
20th-century Indian male actors
Male actors from Kerala
Recipients of the Kerala Sahitya Akademi Award
20th-century Indian screenwriters
Recipients of the Kerala Sangeetha Nataka Akademi Fellowship